Desdemona Mazza was an Italian film actress of the silent era.

Selected filmography
 Miarka (1920)
 The Call of the Blood (1921)
 The Mysteries of Paris (1922)
 The Love Letters of Baroness S (1924)
 Martyr (1927)
 Madame Récamier (1928)
 Venus (1929)
 Sister of Mercy (1929)

References

Bibliography
 Ann C. Paietta. Saints, Clergy and Other Religious Figures on Film and Television, 1895-2003. McFarland, 2005.

External links

1901 births
Year of death missing
Italian film actresses
Italian silent film actresses
20th-century Italian actresses
People from Castel San Pietro Terme